District Education Office is responsible for monitoring educational, administrative and legal activities for schools in districts under the Department of Education, Government of India. As of 2012 the office monitored mandals with government schools and private schools serving more than lakhs students. Two offices are appointed in each district.
District Education Office (Secondary Education) 
District Education Office (Elementary Education)

References

Educational organisations based in India
Education in India by district